David Wang (born 12 January 2000), known in China as Wang Jiahao, is a Spanish professional footballer who plays for Nantong Zhiyun, as a winger.

Club career
Wang was born in Cuenca, Spain, and started his career with Móstoles. He was bought by newly-Chinese-owned Jumilla in 2016, but as they did not have a youth academy set up yet, he was loaned immediately to fellow Spanish side Real Murcia, before joining Josep María Gené on loan the following season. During this period he was included in The Guardian's "Next Generation 2017". Wang signed for English Premier League side Wolverhampton Wanderers in January 2019, and was immediately loaned to Portuguese side Sporting. After failing to secure a place in the Sporting CP youth team, having appeared seven times on the bench, he was recalled from loan. However, he was unable to obtain a UK work visa, and was sent back to Spain with Granollers.

Having only made three substitute appearances with Granollers, Wang was again recalled, and this time sent to China to join China League One side Nantong Zhiyun. After one appearance for Nantong Zhiyun, Wang officially joined the club in February 2021 on a permanent transfer. He would gradually go on to establish himself within the team and helped the club gain promotion to the top tier at the end of the 2022 China League One season.

International career
Wang was called up to the China under-16 national football team in 2015, and has expressed his desire to represent his parents' nation at international level. He is seen as a very highly rated young player in China.

Career statistics

References

External links
 

2000 births
Living people
Chinese footballers
Spanish footballers
Chinese expatriate footballers
Spanish expatriate footballers
Association football midfielders
Association football forwards
FC Jumilla players
Real Murcia players
Wolverhampton Wanderers F.C. players
Sporting CP footballers
EC Granollers players
Nantong Zhiyun F.C. players
Tercera División players
China League One players
Chinese expatriate sportspeople in England
Spanish expatriate sportspeople in England
Chinese expatriate sportspeople in Portugal
Spanish expatriate sportspeople in Portugal
Expatriate footballers in England
Expatriate footballers in Portugal